Michael Clifton Burgess (born December 23, 1950) is an American physician and politician representing  in the United States House of Representatives. The district is anchored in Denton County, a suburban county north of Dallas and Fort Worth.

In 2002, Burgess defeated Scott Armey, the son of House Majority Leader and then-U.S. Representative Dick Armey, in a primary runoff election. Before his election, he practiced as a doctor of obstetrics and gynecology.

Burgess is a member of the congressional Tea Party Caucus, and has been involved in the debates over health care reform and energy policy. He opposes abortion, is unsure of the extent of the contribution of human activity to global warming, supported President Donald Trump's restrictions on travel from Muslim-majority countries and refugee immigration, and supports the repeal of the Affordable Care Act (Obamacare).

Early life, education, and medical career
Michael Burgess was born in Rochester, Minnesota, the son of Norma (née Crowhurst) and Harry Meredith Burgess; his paternal family emigrated from Nova Scotia, Canada. He graduated from North Texas State University (now the University of North Texas) in 1972 and from the medical school at The University of Texas Health Science Center at Houston in 1977. He completed a residency in obstetrics and gynecology at Parkland Memorial Hospital in Dallas. Burgess is an Anglican.

U.S. House of Representatives

Elections
Burgess, who had never held any public office and voted in the Democratic primaries in 1990, 1992, and 1994, entered the 2002 Republican primary election to replace House Majority Leader Dick Armey. His opponent was Armey's son, Scott. The district, comprising almost all of Denton County (except a sliver in the southeast), was strongly Republican, and pundits predicted that whoever won the primary would not only win the general election, but be assured of at least a decade in Congress. Using the campaign slogan "My dad is NOT Dick Armey", Burgess touted the support of medical Political Action Committees and organizations like the National Beer Wholesalers Association. Burgess took second place in the primary, with 23% of the vote to Armey's 45%. Since neither candidate earned the required majority of votes, a runoff election ensued. Before the runoff, The Dallas Morning News released a series of articles alleging that Armey used his influence as a judge to procure county jobs and contracts for his friends. The report hurt Armey's campaign, and Burgess won the runoff with 55% of the vote. He won the general election with 75% of the vote.

Burgess's vote shares include:
66% in 2004
60% in 2006
60% in 2008
67% in 2010
68% in 2012
nearly 84% in 2014 (for the first time, Burgess did not draw a Democratic challenger, and ran against nominal Libertarian opposition)

Burgess won his eighth term in the U.S. House in 2016. With 211,730 votes (66.4%), he defeated Democratic nominee Eric Mauck and Libertarian Mark Boler, who polled 94,507 (29.6%) and 12,843 (4%), respectively.

Burgess won a ninth term in 2018. With 185,268 votes (59.4%), he defeated Democratic nominee Linsey Fagan, who polled 121,584 (39%). Another 5,008 (1.6%) went to Boler, who also ran in 2016.

Burgess was elected to a tenth term in 2020. He received 261,963 votes to Democratic nominee Carol Iannuzzi's 161,009 and Boler's 9,243, winning the election with 60.6% of the vote to 37.3% and 2.1%, respectively.

Tenure

A member of the Republican Party and the Tea Party caucus, Burgess is considered a conservative member of the House. Through 2011, he had a lifetime rating of 93.59% from the American Conservative Union. Burgess is a signer of Americans for Tax Reform's Taxpayer Protection Pledge.

Impeachment of Obama
On August 9, 2011, Burgess met with a Tea Party group in Keller, Texas, to discuss his vote to raise the debt ceiling. When a constituent asked whether the House was considering impeaching President Barack Obama, Burgess responded, "It needs to happen, and I agree with you it would tie things up ... No question about that."

Abortion
In 2013, Burgess voted for legislation to ban abortion after the 22nd week of pregnancy.

Burgess testified that abortion should be banned after 20 weeks of gestation in part because he believes fetuses can feel pain and pleasure.

Immigration and refugees
Burgess opposed the Obama administration's Deferred Action for Childhood Arrivals (DACA) program. In 2010, he voted against the DREAM Act.

Burgess supported President Donald Trump's 2017 executive order to impose a temporary ban on entry to the U.S. to citizens of seven Muslim-majority countries, saying that Trump was "well within his authority" to issue the order and that "Congress should remain involved in the process and provide legislation to strengthen not only border security but vetting those who wish to enter the country through any means."

Health care

Burgess is one of nine medical doctors in Congress, and one of seven in the House of Representatives. In May 2009, Congressional Quarterly wrote that Burgess had "become a prominent voice on health care issues" in the House. Since the 111th United States Congress, he has chaired the Congressional Health Care caucus, of which he is the only official member.

Burgess supports the repeal of the Patient Protection and Affordable Care Act, also known as the ACA or Obamacare. At the 2017 Conservative Political Action Conference, he said he favored covering fewer Americans with health insurance. Burgess said, "If the numbers drop, I would say that's a good thing, because we've restored personal liberty in this country."

Energy and the environment 

As a member of the United States House Energy Subcommittee on Energy and Power, Burgess has been active in the debate over energy policy. In 2011, he submitted an amendment to the 2012 Energy and Water Appropriations Act to defund part of the act that established higher efficiency standards for household light bulbs. Burgess's claims that the standards represented a "ban" on conventional light bulbs were rated as "Mostly False" by the fact-checking website PolitiFact.com. On April 30, 2015, Burgess again introduced an amendment to the $35.4 billion fiscal 2016 energy and water spending bill that would defund the Department of Energy enforcement of incandescent light bulb efficiency standards, which passed 232–189, largely on party lines.

Burgess denies the scientific consensus on climate change. In a March 8, 2011, hearing before the Subcommittee on Energy and Power of the House Committee on Energy and Commerce on the efforts of the Environmental Protection Agency to regulate greenhouse gases, Burgess said "My opinion, for what it is worth, is that the science behind global temperature changes is not settled."

Lowering the voting age
In March 2019, Burgess was the lone Republican to vote to lower the voting age to 16.

Texas v. Pennsylvania
In December 2020, Burgess was one of 126 Republican members of the House of Representatives to sign an amicus brief in support of Texas v. Pennsylvania, a lawsuit filed at the United States Supreme Court contesting the results of the 2020 presidential election, in which Joe Biden defeated Trump. The Supreme Court declined to hear the case on the basis that Texas lacked standing under Article III of the Constitution to challenge the results of an election held by another state.

Iraq
In June 2021, Burgess was one of 49 House Republicans to vote to repeal the AUMF against Iraq.

Syria
In 2023, Burgess was among 47 Republicans to vote in favor of H.Con.Res. 21 which directed President Joe Biden to remove U.S. troops from Syria within 180 days.

Legislation
On February 25, 2014, Burgess introduced the Trauma Systems and Regionalization of Emergency Care Reauthorization Act (H.R. 4080; 113th Congress), a bill that would amend the Public Health Service Act to authorize funding for public and private entities that provide trauma and emergency care services and for the administration of the Federal Interagency Committee on Emergency Medical Services (FICEMS).

Committee assignments
Burgess's committee assignments include:

 Committee on Budget
 Committee on Rules
 Subcommittee on Legislative and Budget Process
 Committee on Energy and Commerce
 Subcommittee on Digital Commerce and Consumer Protection
 Subcommittee on Health
 Subcommittee on Oversight and Investigations

Caucus memberships
 Congressional NextGen 9-1-1 Caucus
Republican Governance Group
Republican Study Committee

Works

See also
 Physicians in the United States Congress

References

External links
 Congressman Michael C. Burgess official U.S. House website
 Michael Burgess for Congress
 
 
 

|-

1950 births
21st-century American politicians
Activists from Texas
American Anglican Church in North America members
American Episcopalians
American gynecologists
American obstetricians
American people of Canadian descent
American Reformed Episcopalians
Episcopalians from Texas
Living people
People from Dallas
People from Lewisville, Texas
Politicians from Rochester, Minnesota
Protestants from Texas
Republican Party members of the United States House of Representatives from Texas
Tea Party movement activists
Physicians from Texas